The Desengano State Park is a state park in the state of Rio de Janeiro, Brazil.
It protects an area of rugged mountains with a large remnant of Atlantic Forest that is home to various endangered species.

Location

The Desengano State Park has an area of  divided between the municipalities of Santa Maria Madalena, São Fidélis and Campos dos Goytacazes in the north of the state of Rio de Janeiro.
The rugged terrain includes ridges, pointed peaks, sugar loaf mountains and scarps with slopes of up to 75 degrees.
Peaks include the Pico do Desengano , Pico São Mateus  and Pedra Agulha .

The park contains the sources of many water courses that supply settlements in the region.
Waterfalls include the  Vernec, Bonita and Tromba d’Água.
The main rivers are the Rio Grande and its tributaries the Macapá and Santíssimo streams, the Colégio River, and the Segundo do Norte, Morumbeca, Aleluia and Mocotó rivers, tributaries of the Imbé River which feeds the Lagoa de Cima (Cima Lake). 
From that lake the Ururaí River flows to the Lagoa Feia.

History

The Desengano State Park is the oldest conservation unit in Rio de Janeiro, created on 13 April 1970 by decree-law 250.
State decree 7.121 of 28 December 28, 1983, republished in the Official Gazette of the State of Rio de Janeiro on 18 January 1984, established an environmental protection area that contained the area of Desengano State Park.
The park is managed by the State Environmental Institute (Inea).

The park managers try to curb hunting and deforestation in the park and its surroundings.
In June 2015 they seized 35 birds and a shotgun in the town of Monte Café. In October 2015 they found evidence of illegal logging in the town of Agulha do Imbé, in the municipality of Santa Maria Madalena, and charged the owner of the land with environmental crime.

Environment

The Desengano State Park has great scenic beauty, with many rocky peaks and flora representative of the original Atlantic Forest biome.
It holds the last continuous remnant of Atlantic Forest in the region.

About 410 species of birds have been found in the region.
283 species of birds are found in the well-preserved alpine meadows, of which 22 are endemic and have low populations.
Endangered bird species include black-fronted piping guan (Pipile jacutinga), solitary tinamou (Tinamus solitarius), white-necked hawk (Buteogallus lacernulatus) and black-and-white hawk-eagle (Spizaetus melanoleucus).
The Penelope, Tinamou, neotropical bellbird, black hawk-eagle (Spizaetus tyrannus) and red-browed amazon (Amazona rhodocorytha) are now only found in protected areas.

Mammals include maned sloth (Bradypus torquatus), cougar (Puma concolor), coati, lowland paca (Cuniculus paca), howler monkeys, nine-banded armadillo (Dasypus novemcinctus), tayra (Eira barbara), collared peccary (Pecari tajacu), white-lipped peccary (Tayassu pecari), titis, brown four-eyed opossum (Metachirus nudicaudatus), Robust capuchin monkeys, furão (Mustelidae species) and crab-eating raccoon (Procyon cancrivorus). 
In July 1999 the highly endangered muriqui was observed, causing great interest in the national and international scientific community and stimulating investment in research and conservation activities.

Notes

Sources

State parks of Brazil
Protected areas established in 1970
1970 establishments in Brazil
Protected areas of Rio de Janeiro (state)